Tourism in Russia has seen rapid growth since the late Soviet times, first domestic tourism and then international tourism as well. Rich cultural heritage and natural variety place Russia among the most popular tourist destinations in the world. Not including Crimea, the country contains 23 UNESCO World Heritage Sites, while many more are on UNESCO's tentative lists.

Major tourist routes in Russia include a travel around the Golden Ring of ancient cities, cruises on the big rivers including the Volga, and long journeys on the Trans-Siberian Railway. Diverse regions and ethnic cultures of Russia offer different foods and souvenirs, and show a great variety of traditions, including Russian Maslenitsa, Tatar Sabantuy, or Siberian shamanist rituals. In 2013, Russia was visited by 33 million tourists, making it the ninth-most visited country in the world and the seventh-most visited in Europe.

After the 2022 Russian invasion of Ukraine, several governments, including the United States, France, the United Kingdom, Australia, and Canada have issued travel advisories calling on their nationals to avoid travel to Russia.

Land and climate 

Central European Russia (e.g. Moscow, Saint Petersburg, Nizhny Novgorod, Kazan, etc.) is in the same climate zone as the Baltic states, Belarus, and northern Ukraine. The climate of south-west Russia (the lower Volga, and the area between the Black Sea and the Caspian Sea) is more arid, with hotter summers and shorter winters. The climate of Russia's Far East along the Pacific coast is similar to that of Hokkaido, Japan and north-east China. The most severe climate is in Siberia where winters are very cold and summers are very hot, and in Russia's Far North where temperatures are always low, with the exception of Murmansk, where the sea never freezes due to the influence of the warm Norwegian Current. The climate of Russia's Black Sea coast is subtropical.

The climate of most popular tourist areas of Russia is similar to that of Eastern Europe. The mean temperatures of December, January and February in Moscow are −4 °C (25 °F), −7 °C (19 °F), −6 °C (21 °F) respectively, but colder weather is common. Over the past few decades spells of extremely cold weather (below −20 °C/-4 °F) in central European Russia have become rare (in the winter 2016/2017, Moscow had temperatures below −20 °C only for three days), while the number of wintry days when the temperature is close to or slightly above the freezing point has grown significantly. In coastal areas wintry temperatures can feel somewhat colder than they actually are due to high humidity.

Unless you are allergic to the pollen of certain trees and herbs (such as birch, horse chestnut, alder, lilac, cherry tree, ash tree, rowan tree, lime tree, or dandelion), the best time for travelling to central European Russia is late spring and early and mid autumn. Summer months are also good except for June in cities in central and south Russia when poplar fluff can be a nuisance. In central European Russia it usually begins to snow in late autumn. Central European Russia sometimes experiences cold spells in early May when the temperature can go from +15 °C/59 °F to the freezing point for a few days.

Tourism

Visa and entry requirements 

The citizens of CIS member states, most Latin American countries, Israel, and South Africa, can travel in Russia for 90 days without a visa; visitors from South Korea can visit Russia for 60 days without a visa; while tourists from Bosnia and Herzegovina, Cuba, Laos, Macau, Macedonia, Mongolia, Montenegro, Serbia, Seychelles and Thailand, can visit for 30 days without a visa. Free e-visas for visiting three regions in Russia's Far East (Primorye, Sakhalin, and Kamchatka) are available for tourists from China, Japan, India, Iran, Turkey, Morocco, Mexico, and some other countries.

Tourists from other countries are required to visit a Russian diplomatic mission to purchase a visa. Tourists are required to have a valid passport when crossing the Russian border. Russian visas cannot be purchased at the border. For more information see visa policy of Russia.

Cultural tourism 

Popular tourist destinations in Russia are Saint Petersburg (which appeared in the list of top visited cities of Europe in 2010) and Moscow, the current and the former capitals of the country, recognized as World Cities. Moscow and Saint Petersburg museums such as Hermitage and Tretyakov Gallery, theaters including Bolshoi and Mariinsky, churches such as Saint Basil's Cathedral, Cathedral of Christ the Saviour, Saint Isaac's Cathedral and Church of the Savior on Blood, fortifications such as Moscow Kremlin and Peter and Paul Fortress, squares such as Red Square and Palace Square, and streets such as Tverskaya and Nevsky Prospect. Palaces and parks are found in the former imperial residences in the suburbs of Moscow (Kolomenskoye, Tsaritsyno) and Saint Petersburg (Peterhof, Strelna, Oranienbaum, Gatchina, Pavlovsk Palace, Tsarskoye Selo). Moscow contains a variety of Soviet-era buildings along with modern skyscrapers, while Saint Petersburg, nicknamed Venice of the North, boasts classical architecture, rivers, channels and bridges.

Nizhny Novgorod is the capital of the Volga region. It is considered to be "younger brother" of Moscow because it has its own Kremlin, the metro, the so-called "Nizhny Novgorod Arbat" (Bolshaya Pokrovskaya Street) and even a copy of the monument to Minin and Pozharsky, the original of which is in the Russian capital. Nizhny Novgorod is divided into two parts by the Oka River. The Upper City is its historical part. Here are the Kremlin, Minin and Pozharsky Square, Bolshaya Pokrovskaya and Rozhdestvenskaya streets, nightclubs, open spaces, a number of monuments and simply historical places. The Lower City is its industrial and commercial part. Here are the Fair, the old Sormovo and Kanavino, GAZ and Sotsgorod (the so-called "city in the city"), the railway terminal, the airport and attractions for people who want to see the styles of underground, industrial and grunge. The city is the main starting point for cruises along Volga River. From here begins shipping to Moscow and St. Petersburg.

Kazan, the capital of Tatarstan, shows a mix of Christian Russian and Muslim Tatar cultures. The city has registered a brand The Third Capital of Russia, though a number of other major Russian cities compete for this status, including Nizhny Novgorod, Novosibirsk, Yekaterinburg and Samara. Veliky Novgorod, Pskov, Dmitrov and the cities of Golden Ring (Vladimir, Yaroslavl, Kostroma and others) have at best preserved the architecture and the spirit of ancient and medieval Rus', and also are among tourist destinations. Many old fortifications (typically Kremlins), monasteries and churches are scattered throughout Russia, forming its unique landscape both in big cities and in remote areas.

Sakha Republic proposes to use former forced labour camps as a tourist attraction.
Poles visit places of Communist crimes, e.g., of the Katyn massacre and Solovetsky Islands.

Museums 
Russia is home to many museums. The most notable include the Tretyakov Gallery, the Kremlin Armoury and the State Historical Museum in Moscow, the Hermitage Museum, and the Russian Museum in St Petersburg, the Kazan Kremlin in Kazan, etc. Russia has many museums related to its literary and classical music heritage, such as Yasnaya Polyana associated with Leo Tolstoy, the Mikhaylovskoye Museum Reserve associated with Alexander Pushkin, the Dostoyevsky Museum, the Tchaikovsky State House-Museum. the Rimsky-Korsakov Apartment and Museum, the Mikhail Glinka Museum in Moscow, the Sergei Rachmaninoff Estate Museum in Ivanovka, Tambov Region, the Alexander Scriabin Apartment Museum in Moscow.

Museums related to Russia's military history and military hardware include the Central Museum of the Great Patriotic War on Poklonnaya Hill, the Central Museum of the Armed Forces of Russia in Moscow, the Central Museum of the Russian Air Force in Monino, Moscow Region, the Central Naval Museum in St Petersburg, the Battle of Stalingrad Museum in Volgograd.

Museums related to science and technology include the Polytechnic Museum of Moscow, the Memorial Museum of Cosmonautics, the Museum of the Energia Rocket and Space Corporation in Korolev, Moscow Region.

Nature tourism 
In Russia, Nature Reserves have long history and it has its own word of definition Zapovedniks (plural заповедники) more than 100 Nature Reserves exist in Russia and more than 50 National Parks it has a great attraction to tourists. several of them are among World Heritage Sites.
The most famous national parks and sanctuaries of Russia include the Baikal Nature Reserve , the Altai Nature Reserve, the Lazovsky Nature Reserve, the Kedrovaya Pad Nature Reserve, the Curonian Spit National Park, the Valdaysky National Park, the Baikal-Lena Nature Reserve, the Ilmen Nature Reserve.
The Seven Wonders of Russia, the most popular tourist destinations chosen in a national vote in 2008, include Lake Baikal, Valley of Geysers, Manpupuner rock formations, and Mount Elbrus.
Other areas interesting for tourists include Kamchatka with its volcanoes and geysers, Karelia where many lakes and granite rocks are found, including, Tyva with its wild steppes, Republic of Adygea where Fisht Mountain is located, Chechnya Republic where Lake Kezenoyam is located.

Health tourism

Several mineral spa resorts have been established across Russia throughout the ages. The most renown regions are Kamchatka Krai, Altai Krai, Krasnodar Krai, Stavropol Krai, North Caucasus region of Russia. Numerous cites enjoy natural hot spring water during winter and some of Russian cities are called Russian Spa town, including Pyatigorsk, Yessentuki, Kislovodsk, Zheleznovodsk and Mineralnye Vody; these towns are jointly known as the Caucasian Mineral Waters.

Russia has one of the largest water borders in world, but only the more Southern regions are suitable for resort tourism. The warm subtropical Black Sea coast of Russia is the site for a number of seaside resorts such as Sochi and Tuapse, known for their shale beaches and the nature of the Caucasus Mountains.

Winter sport
A vast part of Russian territory is in Subarctic climate and humid continental climate, and that is why it is cold. In addition, Russia is mountainous in regions like Northern Caucasus, Altai Krai and Kamchatka Peninsula. The Highest peak in Europe, Mount Elbrus, is in Russia, which makes Russia a place for Winter sport. Ski resorts are common in Russia and 2014 Winter Olympics is the resemblance of how ski resorts has been developed in Russia. A famous ski resort in Russia is Sochi and its Krasnaya Polyana. Other ski resorts in Russia are Dombay in Karachay–Cherkessia in Northern Caucasus.

Medical tourism 

Russia is a destination for medical tourism. A large factor in its continued popularity is the relatively weak ruble post-2014, which saw the industry grow rapidly from some 110 thousand clients in 2017 to some 728 thousand clients in the first five months of 2020. Stomatology is the most popular (44% of patients), genecology and urology follow (25% taken together), the other popular services are plastic surgery (10%), ophthalmology (10%), and cardiology (5%). Most clients come from the CIS states, where receiving high-tech medical assistance can be problematic, particularly from Central Asia, which amounts for 62% of all patients; but also from Eastern Europe (32%), South and East Asia (5%). In addition to price and accessibility of complex manipulations, the difference in regulations between Russia and the clients' own nations is a driving factor for receiving care in Russia: for instance, in vitro fertilization is illegal in China, but legal in Russia.

Religious tourism 

Religious tourism has two main subtypes: pilgrimage, as travel done for religious or spiritual purposes, and the viewing of religious monuments and artefacts, as a kind of sightseeing. The former is relatively insignificant for the Russian tourism industry, amounting for approximately 100 thousands pilgrims yearly. The latter is much more important, places of worship gracing the tourist centers of most Russian cities, or specifically visited even by secular tourists in their remote locations.

Orthodox Christianity being by far the most common religion in Russia, it also accounts for most religious monuments across the country. Multiple Orthodox Christian churches and cathedrals are part of the UNESCO World Heritage Site list.

Muslim peoples have been a part of the Russian state for half a millennium, which means multiple pieces of Islamic religious architectural art are scattered across the country, from mosques to maqāms. They are mostly clustered in the historically Muslim regions, but some can be found in most major cities.

Russia has a significant Buddhist minority, including the Buryats traditionally living near Lake Baikal, the Tuvans, as well as the Kalmyks.

Major national holidays and celebrations 
for a full list see Public holidays in Russia
 Novy God (New Year's Eve), 31 December
 Orthodox Christmas, 7 January
 Maslenitsa, in February or March, in the week before the Lent (according to the Julian calendar)
 Easter, in spring after the Lent (according to the Julian calendar)
 Victory Day, 9 May
 Russia Day, 12 June
 Kupala Night, 7 July
 Day of Christianization of Kievan Rus', 28 July
 Navy Day (Russia), the last Sunday of July (celebrations include naval parades in Saint Petersburg and Vladivostok)
 Unity Day (Russia), 4 November
 Defender of the Fatherland Day, 23 February

Major events 
 KHL Conference Finals and the Gagarin Cup, March and April, final series of the Kontinental Hockey League
 Kinotavr, June, an international film festival in Sochi
 Scarlet Sails Festival, on a Saturday in the second half of June, annual celebration in St Petersburg marking the end of school year
 International Tchaikovsky Competition, 10–30 June, an annual international competition in Moscow, final gala concerts 2–3 July in Moscow and St Petersburg
 Russian Super Cup, July
 MAKS (air show), July, an annual international aerospace show in Zhukovsky, Moscow Region
 Silk Way Rally, July
 Battle on the Neva, July, an international history festival in St Petersburg featuring historical medieval battles (HMB)
 GUM Gorkyclassic Motor Rally, July, an annual motor rally and car parade featuring classic cars in Moscow
 Sabantui, on a Sunday in summer, a major holiday celebrated primarily in Tatarstan and Bashkortostan
 Spasskaya Tower Military Music Festival and Tattoo, the last week of August, the first week of September, an annual international military music festival in Red Square, Moscow
 Eid al-Fitr, 1st day of the month of Shawwal in the Islamic Calendar, in order to mark the end of the holy month of Ramadan
 Eid al-Adha, 10th day of the last month of Dhul-Hijjah in the Islamic calendar, locally known as Kurban Bairam, celebrated primarily in Tatarstan, Bashkortostan, North Caucasus and by Muslim communities in major cities
 Moscow International Film Festival, an international biennial film festival in Moscow
 City Day in Moscow, first Saturday of September, an annual celebration marking the birthday of Moscow
 Borodino Day, first Sunday of September, an annual event in memory of the Battle of Borodino, includes historical re-enactment, in Borodino, Moscow Region
 The Moscow Biennale, dates vary, a biennial contemporary art festival that started in 2003

Souvenirs and food 
Typical souvenirs include the Matryoshka doll and other handicraft, samovars for water heating, ushanka and papaha warm hats, and fur clothes. Russian vodka and caviar are among the food that attracts foreigners, along with honey, blini, pelmeni, shchi soup and other products and dishes of Russian cuisine.

Regions and localities associated with specific souvenirs and products 
 Caviar: Primorye Territory; Sakhalin; Kamchatka
 Honey: Bashkortostan; Altai Territory; Krasnodar Territory
 Pryaniki: Tula; Arkhangelsk; Vyazma, Smolensk Region; Pokrov, Vladimir Region; Gorodets, Nizhny Novgorod Region
 Chocolate: Moscow; Pokrov, Vladimir Region
 Amber: Kaliningrad
 Diamonds: Yakutsk
 Glass souvenirs: St Petersburg; Moscow; Gus-Khrustalny, Vladimir Region
 Gems: Nizhny Tagil; Yekaterinburg
 Beresta (birch bark) souvenirs: Arkhangelsk; Semyonov, Nizhny Novgorod Region
 Metalwork: Tula; Zhostovo, Ivanovo Region 
 Wooden souvenirs and pottery: Gorodets, Nizhny Novgorod Region; Palekh, Ivanovo Region; Gzhel, Moscow Region; Dymkovo District of Kirov; Filimonovo, Tula Region; Semyonov, Nizhny Novgorod Region
 Textiles: Ivanovo; Yaroslavl
 Wool products: Moscow; Pavlovsky Posad, Moscow Region; Orenburg
 Lace: Vologda; Yelets, Lipetsk Region
 Valenki and felt products: Yaroslavl; Yelets, Lipetsk Region; Ivanovo
 Furs: Pyatigorsk; Kazan; Ulyanovsk; Tver
 Wristwatches and clocks: Moscow; Chelyabinsk

Transport 
For security reasons, Russian ticket offices sell tickets for trains, airplanes and coaches only if you show your passport.

Railways 

The state-owned company Russian Railways (abbreviated as РЖД) operates most of rail services across the country and is crucial for the rail transport in Russia. High-speed rail services are available between Moscow and St Petersburg, between Moscow and Nizhny Novgorod, and between St Petersburg and Helsinki (Finland). European Russia and the Russian Far East are connected by rail via the Trans-Siberian Railway. A train trip from Moscow to Vladivostok takes 6 days. Russia uses the 1,524mm (5ft) track gauge, which is also shared by all the former Soviet republics (Estonia, Latvia, Lithuania, Belarus, Ukraine, Georgia, Armenia, Azerbaijan, Kazakhstan, Turkmenistan, Tajikistan, Uzbekistan, Kyrgyzstan), Mongolia, and is practically identical with the rail gauge of Finland. Trains crossing the border between Russia (Belarus, Ukraine) and EU member states (except the Baltic states and Finland) or between Russia and China, stop at special crossing points where each carriage is lifted for its bogies to be changed. Trains remain at crossing points for up to 2 hours.

Sea and river transport 

Russia's major sea ports include St Petersburg and Kaliningrad on the Baltic coast; Murmansk and Arkhangelsk on the Arctic coast; Vladivostok, Yuzhno-Sakhalinsk, and Petropavlovsk-Kamchatsky on the Pacific coast; Sochi, Novorossiysk, and Sevastopol on the Black Sea coast; Astrakhan on the Caspian coast. In European Russia, many river boat companies offer journeys to cities and towns on the Volga River, its tributaries and connected canals: Moscow (via the Moscow Canal), Yaroslavl, Kostroma, Nizhny Novgorod, Kazan, Saratov, Volgograd, Astrakhan. River boats from St Petersburg can travel to Staraya Ladoga and Veliky Novgorod on the Volkhov River, to Ladoga Lake, and to Moscow (via canals).

Air transport 
Due to the 2022 Russian invasion of Ukraine, the airspace of the EU, Switzerland, the UK, Canada, the US, and several other countries were closed to all Russian aircraft and flights. Also, a number of airlines cancelled flights into and out of Russia. In addition, airspace around southern Russia is restricted, and a number of airports in the area closed.

Russia's busiest international airports are situated near Moscow, St Petersburg, Volgograd, Kazan, Krasnodar, Sochi, and Vladivostok. For more information see a list of airports in Russia. Moscow and Saint Petersburg had prior to the invasion been served by direct flights from most European capitals, and Moscow also had direct flights from many cities in East Asia, South Asia, Africa, the Middle East, and North America. Countries that have no direct flights to Russia include Australia, Canada and Ukraine.

Roads 
Major national thoroughfares are known as federal highways. For more information see Russian federal highways. Most of highways are toll-free, however recently there have opened a few toll roads. Usual roads in smaller Russian cities and in the countryside can be in bad condition. During the cold season (from November till April), when there is permanent snowpack and ice on the roads, winter tyres are mandatory.

Public transport in major cities 

Russian cities that have a metro include Moscow, St Petersburg, Nizhny Novgorod, Novosibirsk, Samara, Yekaterinburg, Kazan. Entrances to metro stations are marked using the letter M which looks the same in the Russian and Roman alphabets. On the Moscow Metro, announcements on trains are made in Russian and English, and direction signs and maps often include English. Apart from buses and trams, trolleybuses are a very common means of overground transport in Russian cities. 
For more information see the list of trolleybus systems in Russia. Another widely used means of public transport is marshrutkas, or shared taxies. If you are going to visit Moscow and use public transport, see the article about the Troika card (a similar card known as Podorozhnik is used in St Petersburg). Taxi services available in major Russian cities include Yandex, Uber (operated by Yandex.Taxi), and Gett.

Safety

Natural disasters 
Natural hazards of central European Russia include hurricanes, thunderstorms, and spring floods when snowpack accumulated during the winter melts away; south Russia sometimes experiences flash floods. Earthquakes only occur in Russia in mountainous areas in the south (the Caucasus Mountains, the Altai Mountains) and the Pacific coast. Forest fires can occur in hot summers, especially in south Siberia.

Dangerous animals 
Big wild animals such as bears and wolves are common in wooded areas of Siberia and Russia's Far East. They also inhabit some remote thick forests in north-east European Russia. Female bears can be especially dangerous when they have cubs, while male bears are especially dangerous if they wake up and roam in wintertime; wolves are dangerous in the winter period. The only poisonous snake in central European Russia is the viper; it mainly inhabits boggy and marshy forests but can occasionally be met in other types of forests, so high boots are advisable for forest trips and hikes. Tick-borne encephalitis is another hazard that is associated with forests and parks in Russia. Animals that are most prone to rabies are stray dogs and cats, wild foxes, wolves, hedgehogs, raccoon dogs.

Environmental contamination 
A certain level of radioactive contamination caused by rains following the Chernobyl disaster is found in some parts of Bryansk Region and Tula Region. High levels of industrial contamination are found in the city of Norilsk and in Chelyabinsk Region and Sverdlovsk Region.

Socio-cultural concerns

Public safety 
According to travel advice by the UK government, "most visits to Russia are trouble-free, but petty crime does happen".

Nearly 20,000 people in Russia were killed as a result of crimes in January-October 2021, according to the Russian Interior Ministry.

In June 2022, the US State Department advised citizens not to travel to the North Caucasus, including Chechnya and Mount Elbrus, due to terrorism, kidnapping, and risk of civil unrest.

Militant groups 
Most regions of Russia are safe. However, travels to some areas in North Caucasus can pose a certain risk, especially parts of Chechnya and Dagestan.

Foreign travel statistics 
In 2013, 27 million international tourists arrived in Russia, generating US$11.2 billion in international tourism revenue for the country. Including domestic and international tourism, the industry directly contributed RUB860 billion to the Russian GDP and supported 966,500 jobs in the country.

See also 
 Visa policy of Russia
 Russian culture
 List of museums in Russia
 List of World Heritage Sites in Russia
 Wildlife of Russia

References

External links 

 Moscow City Guide at the official website of the Mayor of Moscow
 St Petersburg Official City Guide
 Karelia Tourist Portal (Solovetsky Islands, Kizhi)
 Guide to the Golden Ring of Russia
 Tatarstan Official Guide(including Kazan)
 Official Rosa Khutor Guide (ski resorts in Sochi)
 Baikal Tourist Guide
 Vladivostok City Guide
 Russia Travel Guide
 
 Fully Personalized Itineraries for independent travel in Russia
 Representing in North America: Russian National Tourist Office
  Federal Agency for Tourism
 Russia Beyond the Headlines news portal
 Cheboksary tourist portal 

List of Spa towns in Russia
List of Seaside resorts in Russia
List of Ski resorts in Russia
 
Russia
Russia